In mathematics, generalized Verma modules are a generalization of a (true) Verma module, and are objects in the representation theory of Lie algebras. They were studied originally by James Lepowsky in the 1970s. The motivation for their study is that their homomorphisms correspond to invariant differential operators over generalized flag manifolds. The study of these operators is an important part of the theory of parabolic geometries.

Definition

For any irreducible finite-dimensional representation  of  we define the generalized Verma module to be the relative tensor product

.

Note that  makes sense only for -dominant and -integral weights (see weight) .

It is well known that a parabolic subalgebra  of  determines a unique grading  so that .
Let .
It follows from the Poincaré–Birkhoff–Witt theorem that, as a vector space (and even as a -module and as a -module),

.

In further text, we will denote a generalized Verma module simply by GVM.

Properties of GVMs

GVM's are weight modules, i.e. they are direct sum of its weight spaces and these weight spaces are finite-dimensional.

As all highest weight modules, GVM's are quotients of Verma modules. The kernel of the projection  is

In (1), we identified . The sum in (1) is not direct.

In the special case when , the parabolic subalgebra  is the Borel subalgebra and the GVM coincides with (true) Verma module. In the other extremal case when ,  and the GVM is isomorphic to the inducing representation V.

The GVM  is called regular, if its highest weight λ is on the affine Weyl orbit of a dominant weight . In other word, there exist an element w of the Weyl group W such that

where  is the affine action of the Weyl group.

The Verma module  is called singular, if there is no dominant weight on the affine orbit of λ. In this case, there exists a weight  so that  is on the wall of the fundamental Weyl chamber (δ is the sum of all fundamental weights).

Homomorphisms of GVMs

By a homomorphism of GVMs we mean -homomorphism.

For any two weights  a homomorphism

This follows easily from the Harish-Chandra theorem on infinitesimal central characters.

Unlike in the case of (true) Verma modules, the homomorphisms of GVM's are in general not injective and the dimension

may be larger than one in some specific cases.

If  is a homomorphism of (true) Verma modules,  resp.  is the kernels of the projection , resp. , then there exists a homomorphism  and f factors to a homomorphism of generalized Verma modules . Such a homomorphism (that is a factor of a homomorphism of Verma modules) is called standard. However, the standard homomorphism may be zero in some cases.

Standard

Let us suppose that there exists a nontrivial homomorphism of true Verma modules .
The following theorem is proved by Lepowsky:

The structure of GVMs on the affine orbit of a -dominant and -integral weight  can be described explicitly.

The following statements follow from the above theorem and the structure of :

Theorem. If  for some positive root  and the length (see Bruhat ordering) l(w')=l(w)+1, then there exists a nonzero standard homomorphism .

Theorem.

However, if  is only dominant but not integral, there may still exist -dominant and -integral weights on its affine orbit.

Nonstandard

A homomorphism  is called nonstandard, if it is not standard. It may happen that the standard homomorphism of GVMs is zero but there still exists a nonstandard homomorphism.

Bernstein–Gelfand–Gelfand resolution

Examples

 The fields of conformal field theory belong to generalized Verma modules of the conformal algebra.

See also
Verma module
Parabolic geometry

External links 

 Code for constructing the BGG resolution of Lie algebra modules and computing its cohomology

References

Representation theory of Lie algebras